Guitar Soul! is the second album by guitarist Billy Butler which was recorded in 1969 and released on the Prestige label.

Reception

Alex Henderson of Allmusic calls the album a "creative triumph" and states "Guitar Soul reflects Butler's diversity".

Track listing 
 "Blow for the Crossing" (Charles Black, Billy Butler) - 9:27 
 "Golden Earrings" (Ray Evans, Jay Livingston, Victor Young) - 4:04 
 "The Thumb" (Wes Montgomery) - 4:16  
 "Honky Tonk" (Billy Butler, Bill Doggett, Clifford Scott, Shep Shepherd) - 5:46 
 "B & B Calypso" (Bob Bushnell) - 3:00
 "Seven Come Eleven" (Charlie Christian) - 5:43 
 "Autumn Nocturne/You Go to My Head" (Kim Gannon, Josef Myrow/J. Fred Coots, Haven Gillespie) - 3:27  
Recorded at Van Gelder Studio in Englewood Cliffs, New Jersey on September 22, 1969

Personnel 
Billy Butler - guitar, bass guitar, acoustic guitar
Seldon Powell - varitone, tenor saxophone, flute
Sonny Phillips - organ
Bob Bushnell - electric bass
Specs Powell - drums

References 

Billy Butler (guitarist) albums
1969 albums
Prestige Records albums
Albums recorded at Van Gelder Studio
Albums produced by Bob Porter (record producer)